The Weiwang M50F is a MPV produced by Weiwang, a sub-brand of BAIC. A more premium variant called the Weiwang M60 is also available with more radical styling and upgraded powertrain.

Overview

The Beijing Auto Weiwang M50F was launched in November 2016 with a 7-seat 2/2/3 configuration. There are two powertrain options with the 1.3 liter turbo engine mated to a six-speed manual transmission, and the 1.5 liter engine mated to a five-speed manual transmission.

Platform sharing
Weiwang is a brand under the Beiqi Yinxiang Automobile, a joint venture between Beijing Auto (Beiqi) and the Yinxiang Motorcycle Group from Chongqing. This joint venture also sells the Huansu brand and the Weiwang M50F is based on the same platform as the Huansu H3.

Weiwang M60
The Weiwang M60 is the more premium and crossover version of the regular Weiwang M50F featuring plastic claddings around the wheel arches, a redesigned front bumper with grilles inspired by the Lexus spindle grilles and a slightly redesigned rear bumper. The Weiwang M60 was also sold as the Changhe Freedom M60 under the Changhe brand of BAIC. In terms of powertrain, the Weiwang M60 is available with a 1.5 liter engine developing 116 hp and a 1.5 liter turbo engine developing 150 hp.

Overseas market version
The Weiwang M60 is also rebadged as the Innoson Ikenga or IVM M20 and sold by Innoson Vehicle Manufacturing in Nigeria.

References

External links

M50F Official website
M60 Official website

Compact MPVs
Microvans
2010s cars
BAIC Group vehicles
Cars of China